Lawrence's girdled lizard (Namazonurus lawrenci) is a species of lizard in the family Cordylidae. The species is endemic to South Africa.

Etymology
The specific name, lawrenci, is in honor of South African entomologist Reginald Frederick Lawrence.

References

Further reading
Branch, Bill (2004). Field Guide to Snakes and other Reptiles of Southern Africa. Third Revised edition, Second impression. Sanibel Island, Florida: Ralph Curtis Books. 399 pp. . (Cordylus lawrenci, pp. 189–190 + Plate 68).
FitzSimons VFM (1939). "Descriptions of some new species and subspecies of lizards from South Africa". Ann. Transvaal Mus. 20 (1): 5–16. (Zonurus lawrenci, new species).

Namazonurus
Reptiles of South Africa
Reptiles described in 1939
Taxa named by Vivian Frederick Maynard FitzSimons
Taxonomy articles created by Polbot